Denise Margaret Robertson-Boyd  (born 15 December 1952) is an Australian former Olympic sprinter, who reached two Olympic finals in the 200 metres sprint. Boyd won the gold medal for 200 metres at the 1978 Commonwealth Games in Edmonton.

Boyd's best performances were:

100 m: 11.35 (Moscow, 1980)
200 m: 22.35 (Sydney, 1980)
400 m: 51.48 (Melbourne, 1983)

Her husband, Ray Boyd was also a Commonwealth Games champion and double-Olympic representative in the pole vault. The Boyds have three children, all of whom are successful athletes:

Alana (born 10 May 1984) - 4.55 m Olympic pole vaulter
Jacinta (born 10 February 1986) - 6.64 m long jumper
Matthew (Matt) (born 29 April 1988) - 5.35 m pole vaulter

In 2009 Denise Boyd was inducted into the Queensland Sport Hall of Fame.

See also
 Australian athletics champions (Women)

References

External links

1952 births
Living people
Sportswomen from Queensland
Australian female sprinters
Olympic athletes of Australia
Athletes (track and field) at the 1976 Summer Olympics
Athletes (track and field) at the 1980 Summer Olympics
Commonwealth Games medallists in athletics
Commonwealth Games gold medallists for Australia
Commonwealth Games silver medallists for Australia
Commonwealth Games bronze medallists for Australia
Athletes (track and field) at the 1974 British Commonwealth Games
Athletes (track and field) at the 1978 Commonwealth Games
Athletes (track and field) at the 1982 Commonwealth Games
Olympic female sprinters
Medallists at the 1974 British Commonwealth Games
Medallists at the 1978 Commonwealth Games
Medallists at the 1982 Commonwealth Games